KRBG (88.7 FM) is a radio station licensed to serve Umbarger, Texas. The station is owned by Grace Community Church of Amarillo. It airs a Religious radio format.

The station was assigned the KWDH call letters by the Federal Communications Commission on October 11, 2006. On October 1, 2008, it changed to the current call sign of KRBG.

KRBG's programming is also heard on sister station KBZD (99.7 FM) in Amarillo, Texas.

Translators
KRBG programming is also carried on multiple broadcast translator stations to extend or improve the coverage area of the main station.

References

External links
Radio By Grace

Radio stations established in 2008
Contemporary Christian radio stations in the United States
Randall County, Texas
RBG
2008 establishments in Texas